The 2014 IIHF Challenge Cup of Asia – Division I was an international ice hockey competition played between 24 February and 2 March 2014 in Bishkek, Kyrgyzstan.

Round-round

Standings

All times local. (UTC+06:00)

Playoff round

Bracket

† Indicates overtime win‡ Indicates shootout win

Semi-finals
All times local. (UTC+06:00)

Bronze medal game
Time is local. (UTC+06:00)

Gold medal game
Time is local. (UTC+06:00)

Ranking and statistics

Final standings

Leading scorers
Rankings based upon points, and sorted by goals.

Leading goaltenders
Goalkeepers with 40% or more of their team's total minutes, ranked by save percentage.

References

External links
2014 IIHF Challenge Cup of Asia Division I at iihf.com

Chal
I
IIHF Challenge Cups of Asia
I
Sport in Bishkek